Poeltiaria is a genus of lichen-forming fungi in the family Lecideaceae. It was circumscribed in 1984 by lichenologist Hannes Hertel, with Poeltiaria turgescens assigned as the type species.

The genus name of Poeltiaria is in honour of Josef Poelt (1924-1995), who was a German-Austrian botanist (Bryology, Mycology and Lichenology) and was Professor of Systematic Botany at the Free University of Berlin in 1965.

Species
Poeltiaria coppinsiana 
Poeltiaria coromandelica 
Poeltiaria corralensis 
Poeltiaria howickensis 
Poeltiaria tasmanica 
Poeltiaria turgescens 
Poeltiaria urbanskyana 

The taxon once occupying the name Poeltiaria subcontinua  has since been transferred to the monotypic genus Notolecidea, as Notolecidea subcontinua.

References

Lecideales
Lecideales genera
Lichen genera
Taxa described in 1984
Taxa named by Hannes Hertel